Antoinette Ardizzone (February 15, 1924 – May 29, 2012), known professionally as Toni Arden, was an American traditional pop music singer.

Family
Arden was born in New York City. Her father, Phillip Ardizzone, was a singer with the Metropolitan Opera and La Scala. Her brother, Jan Arden, was also a singer. The siblings teamed up for night club performances in the late 1950s.

Career

Early years
Arden became a big band singer in the 1940s, singing with Al Trace, Joe Reichman, Ray Bloch and Shep Fields.

Recording
She started recording as a soloist in 1946 for the minor National Records company. After her appearance on the early television talent series Doorway to Fame, Arden signed her first solo recording contract with a major record label, Columbia Records, in 1949 (Arden was arguably the only performer out of 20,000 over Doorway to Fame's two-year run on air to become relatively famous); at Columbia, she had several hits including "I Can Dream, Can't I?" (which reached No. 7 on the Billboard charts), "Too Young" (which reached No. 15), "Kiss of Fire" (which reached No. 14) and "I'm Yours" (which reached No. 24). CD compilations of these earlier recordings can be found on the Sepia Records label and a two-CD set released by Jasmine Records.<ref>{{cite web|url=http://www.jasmine-records.co.uk/acatalog/jascd-644.html |title=Toni ARDEN - I Can Dream, Cant I? |publisher=Jasmine-records.co.uk |date=2005-10-21 |accessdate=2012-02-16}}</ref>

In the mid-1950s she moved to Decca Records, where her biggest selling record (her only million-seller) was "Padre" in 1958, which peaked at No. 13. LP albums included "Miss Toni Arden", "Besame!", "Sing a Song of Italy" and "Italian Gold". She sang in both Italian and English. The first two albums have been compiled on a second CD by the Sepia Records label. She also recorded briefly for RCA Victor and Mercury Records. Her last album, My World is You (on GPRT Records), features the compositions of Gladys Shelley.

Radio
In 1954, Arden recorded 13 radio programs for the US Marine Corps via electrical transcription. The Toni Arden Show was broadcast on participating local stations. In 1956, she was featured on an episode of What's New in Music on CBS.

Television
Arden appeared on The Music of George Gershwin, This Is Show Business, Dick Clark's program, and The Jimmy Dean Show. She and her brother, Jan, sang two duets on The Ed Sullivan Show in 1959.

Album
1955 Shep Fields and his Orchestra with Toni Arden (Royale, 18142)
1958 Miss Toni Arden (Decca Records, DL 8651)
1958 Sing a Song of Italy (Decca Records, DL 78765)
1959 Besame! (Decca Records, DL 8875)
1959 The Exciting Toni Arden (Harmony, HL 7212)
1963 Italian Gold (Decca Records, DL 4375)
1964 Stars for Defense (Office of Civil Defense)
1968 The Life of Christ (Manor Records, MRS 201)
2004 Al Trace and his Musicians featuring Toni Arden (Circle Records, CCD-109)
2005 I Can Dream, Can't I? (Jasmine Records, JASCD 644)
2005 This Is Toni Arden (Sepia Records, SEPIA 1050)
2012 Besame! (Sepia Records, SEPIA 1188)
2021 The Toni Arden Collection 1944-61 (Acrobat Music, ADDCD3375)
xxxx Toni Arden In American Love Songs (Tiara Records, TST 525)
xxxx The Bing Crosby Show (Redmond Nostalgia, CD-172)

Compilation/Appearances
1957 Meet the Girls (Halo, 50254), with Two Loves and Let's Be Sweethearts Again1959 The Girl Friends (Harmony, HL 7148), with A Little Love a Little Kiss and I Can Dream, Can't I?xxxx America's Sweethearts featuring Kitty Kallen, Toni Arden, Fran Warren (Viking, VK 019)
xxxx The Girl Friends (American Radio Transcription Library, A.R.T. 118), with All of Mexxxx American Vocal Parade II (Philips, B 07643 R), with F'r Instancexxxx Music from Latin America (Decca Records, DL 38078), with Medley: La Paloma, La Golondrinaxxxx Buitoni Presents Souvenir of Italy (Decca Records, DL 38291), with Medley: Vieni su - Vicini u mare - Drigo's Serenade and Fa la nana bambin''

Death
She died at her home in Lake Worth, Florida, on May 29, 2012 at the age of 88.

References

External links
Toni Arden bio on Saxony Records site
Image gallery from Toni Arden's career at Saxony Records site

1924 births
2012 deaths
Traditional pop music singers
American women pop singers
RCA Victor artists
Decca Records artists
People from Lake Worth Beach, Florida
Columbia Records artists
Mercury Records artists
21st-century American women